Morello may refer to:

 The Mysterious Geographic Explorations of Jasper Morello, 2005 Australian short film, whose first episode is titled: "Jasper Morello and the Lost Airship"
 Morello cheese, an Italian sheep cheese made from goat's milk
 Monte Morello, highest mountain (3065 ft.) in the Florentine valley, Italy
 Morello (surname), list of people with the surname
 Morello cherry, a cultivar of the sour cherry
 Morello crime family, Sicilian immigrants and founders of the American mafia in New York
 Morello, racing horse of Lorenzo de Medici

See also
 Morella (disambiguation)